Thaskaraveeran ( The brave thief /The great thief ) is a 2005 Indian Malayalam-language film directed by Pramod Pappan. The film stars Mammootty with Nayanthara, Sheela, Madhu, Innocent, Rajan P.Dev, Siddique, and Mamukkoya in supporting roles. It has a dubbed Hindi version which is called Kala Samrajya.

Plot
Arakkalam Peeli, a veteran thief, adept in creating different masks was killed by Eapen with an indirect support from the former's son Arakkalam Kuttappan. Kuttappan's son, Baby, who happens to witness the murder runs away from the village. He later becomes a smuggler and robber.

Several years later Kuttappan is sent to prison by a cunning Eapen who is then a rich businessman over an issue related to loan. This causes Baby to return to his village. He gives him gold biscuits to settle the matter and bails out his father. That night Baby manages to steal the same biscuits from Eapen's house by pretending to be his eldest son Thommi. He uses a mask just as his grandfather used to. After handing over the biscuits to Mumbai-based gangster he decides to settle in his village. He stays with Meenakshi, his late grandfather's ex-lover, and seldom meets his father (as he is unable to completely forgive him due to his involvement in his grandfather's murder). He vows to destroy the wealth of Eapen and how he does it forms the rest of the story.

Cast

 Mammootty as Arakkalam Kochu Baby / Arakkalam Bhai
 Nayantara as Thankamani
 Sheela as Meenakshi
 Innocent as Malayil Eapen
 Rajan P. Dev as Arakkalam Kuttappan
 Siddique as Malayil Thommi
 Baburaj as Malayil Peter
Niyaz Musaliyar as Malayil Johnny
 Kiranraj as Haafiz Akbar Jinnah
 Madhu as 	Arakkalam Peeli
 Salim Kumar as Postman	Sugathan
 Mohan Jose as Chandy
 Augustine as CI Ayyappan Pillai
 T. P. Madhavan as Ramkumar
 Spadikam George as Malayil Itty
 Bheeman Raghu as Kargil Narayanan
 Kunchan as  Raghavan Maashu
 Radhika as Sethulakshmi
 Kishor Sathya as Deepu
 Biyon as Balu
 Subbaraju as Smuggler 
 Anil Nedumangad as Narayanan Kutty
 Dinesh Prabhakar as Villager
 Mamukkoya	as Beerankutty
 Deepika Mohan as Raghavan's wife
 Sruthi Nair

Soundtrack
"Chenthamare Vaa" - Madhu Balakrishnan
"Aarthirimulle" - Balu
"Karimukilil" - Franco
"Aarthirimulle (version 2)" - Srinivas

References

External links 
 

2005 films
2000s Malayalam-language films
Indian heist films
Films directed by Pramod Pappan
Films scored by Ouseppachan
Films shot in Palakkad